was a fudai feudal domain under the Tokugawa shogunate of Edo period Japan. It is located in Echigo Province, Honshū. The domain was centered at Nagaoka Castle, located in what is now part of the city of Nagaoka in Niigata Prefecture. The domain was ruled by the Makino clan for most of its history. During the summer of 1868, it was the center of some of the fiercest fighting during the Boshin War. Admiral Yamamoto Isoroku was the son of a Nagaoka samurai.

History
The territory of Nagaoka Domain was originally part of the holdings of Takada Domain with the exception of a 60,000  koku holding called  held by a branch of the Hori clan for their services to Toyotomi Hideyoshi. After the daimyō of Takada Domain, Matsudaira Tadateru was disgraced at the Siege of Osaka in 1616 and relieved of his holdings, Hori Naoyori was awarded with Zaodo Domain and an additional 20,000 koku from the former Takada lands. He quickly saw that the seat of Zaodo Domain was in a poor location prone to flooding by the Shinano River, and built a new castle on the high ground on the opposite back at what is now Nagaoka. This marked the start of Nagaoka Domain. In 1618, he was transferred to Murakami Domain, and Nagaoka was assigned to Makino Tadanari, formerly of Nagasaki Domain. In 1620, the domain kokudaka was raised by 10,000 koku, and was raised again by 2,000 koku in 1625.   The domain, which extended across the Echigo Plain from western Niigata City, through Koshi District, Santō District and Nishikanbara District was excellent rice land, and also controlled the port of Niigata with its Kitamaebune trade, and therefore the actual revenues of the domain were far in excess of its official kokudaka. The actual revenues of the domain were 115,300 koku in 1712, and 142,700 koku in 1858 as opposed to its official rating of 74,000 koku.  Under the rule of the Makino clan, the domain was noted for its military organisation and sponsorship of training in the various military arts. During the Battle of Hokuetsu in the Boshin War, Nagaoka joined the Ōuetsu Reppan Dōmei, and was the site of fierce fighting between pro-Tokugawa forces and the imperial army. Kawai Tsugunosuke and Yamamoto Tatewaki were two senior Nagaoka commanders during the war. After the defeat of the pro-Tokugawa alliance, the domain was reduced to 24,000  koku. In July 1871, with the abolition of the han system, Nagaoka Domain briefly became Nagaoka Prefecture, and was merged into the newly created Niigata Prefecture. Under the new Meiji government, the final daimyō of Nagaoka, Makino Tadakatsu served as domain governor, and later was a student at Keio Gijuku. His brother, Makino Tadaatsu was given the kazoku peerage title of shishaku (viscount) and served as Mayor of Nagaoka and as a member of the House of Peers.

Bakumatsu period holdings
As with most domains in the han system, Nagaoka Domain consisted of several discontinuous territories calculated to provide the assigned kokudaka, based on periodic cadastral surveys and projected agricultural yields.

Echigo Province
263 villages in Koshi District
83 villages in Kanbara District
70 villages in Santō District
17 villages in Kariwa District

List of daimyō

See also 
 List of Han

References

External links

 "Nagaoka" at Edo 300 

Domains of Japan
Nagaoka, Niigata
History of Niigata Prefecture
Echigo Province
Ōuetsu Reppan Dōmei